Central Warehouse may refer to:

Chambers Transfer & Storage Co.-Central Warehouse, Phoenix, Arizona, listed on the NRHP in Arizona
Central Warehouse (Saginaw, Michigan), listed on the NRHP in Michigan 
Central Warehouse (Salt Lake City, Utah), listed on the NRHP in Utah